The following is a list of governors of the Falkland Islands. Historically, several countries have had leaders on the islands with varying titles and degrees of power.

List of governors

Administrator of the French Settlement of Fort St. Louis

Military Administrators of the British Settlement of Port Egmont

Military Administrators of the Spanish Settlement of Puerto Soledad

Military and Civil Commander of Puerto Luis (Port Louis)

Military Administrators of the British Settlement of Fort Louis

Lieutenant Governor of the Falkland Islands at Anson's Harbour

Governor of the Falkland Islands at Port Stanley

Argentine Military Commanders during 1982 Occupation

British Military Commander at Port Stanley

Civil Commissioner of the Falkland Islands at Port Stanley

Governors of the Falkland Islands at Stanley (and Commissioner for South Georgia and the South Sandwich Islands from 1985)

External links

 Falkland Islands Government - Organisation
 Falkland Island info
 World Statesmen

Falkland Islands
Falkland Islands Governors
Falkland Islands Governors
Falkland Islands-related lists